Marion Motin is a French dancer and choreographer.

Biography 
Very young Marion Motin studied dancing. On stage, she danced with M Pokora, Shy'm, Madonna (The MDNA Tour in 2012), Robbie Williams's clip (Rudebox, 2006) and Angelin Preljocaj.

In 2009, she created her company Swaggers.

She's the choreographer of Stromae (2013), Christine and the Queens (2014) and France Gall's musical, Résiste (2015).

Choreographer

Clips 
 2013 : Papaoutai by Stromae
 2013 : Tous les mêmes by Stromae
 2014 : Saint Claude by Christine and the Queens
 2014 : Christine by Christine and the Queens
 2015 : Quand c'est by Stromae
 2018 : Défiler (bande originale de la capsule n°5 Mosaert) by Stromae
 2018 : IDGAF by Dua Lipa

Shows 
 2014 : In the middle, tour
 2015 : Résiste by France Gall and Dawit Bruck, Palais des Sports (Paris), tour

Filmography 
 2012 : StreetDance 2 by Max Giwa and Dania Pasquini

References

External links 
  Official site
  Allociné

French female dancers
French choreographers
Modern dancers
Living people
Year of birth missing (living people)
Place of birth missing (living people)